The 2013–14 season is the 104th season of competitive football by Ayr United, their first season in the newly formed Scottish League One and their second consecutive season in the third tier of Scottish football. Ayr also competed in the Challenge Cup, League Cup and the Scottish Cup

Summary

Season

Ayr United finished in fourth place in League One and qualified for the Scottish Championship play-offs, losing 5-2 on aggregate to Cowdenbeath. Ayr also reached the Second round of the Challenge Cup, the First round of the League Cup and the Fourth round of the Scottish Cup.

Results and fixtures

Pre–Season

Scottish League One

Championship play-off

Scottish Challenge Cup

Scottish League Cup

Scottish Cup

Player statistics

Squad, appearance and goals
As of 3 May 2014

Club statistics

League table

Transfers

Players In

Players out

References

Ayr United F.C. seasons
Ayr United